Kacheri Aarambam or simply Kacheri is a 2010 Indian action comedy film written and directed by Thiraivannan, starring Jiiva and Poonam Bajwa, whilst, J. D. Chakravarthy plays a pivotal role. The film was released on 19 March 2010.This movie is loosely based on the malayalam movie pandipada. It received negative reviews but became a box office success.

Synopsis
The film starts with a flashback as Paari is on a train looking back at everything that occurred. The beginning introduces a remote village in Ramanathapuram and shows the main character, Paari. Paari is a do-gooder helping everyone in need. A magnanimous man, he gives anything and everything to others if they ask for it. For example, he gives the groom at a wedding his bike, when he doesn't get one from the bride's father as dowry. He also gives a group of homeless people 1 lakh from a bank loan which his father asked for. A magnanimous man, he gives anything and everything to others if they ask for it. Promising his father Vasu to earn more, Paari sets out to Chennai but faces more challenges. He meets a young girl Madhi and falls in love with her but some goons also cause trouble for Paari. Meanwhile, Sivamani, the dreaded but sophisticated crime boss of the city, is getting ready to marry Madhi. When the two stories meet, chaos ensues. It is up to Paari and Sivamani to sort it out.

Cast

Reception
The film received negative reviews. Behindwoods.com gave the film 1.5/5 stating that "Kacheri Aarambam is a Dappan Kuthu Kutcheri". Sify.com gave it a 3/5. Aravind DI of nowrunning.com gave it 2/5 saying that "Kacheri Aarambam is a typical commercial potboiler".

Music
The music was composed by D. Imman with positive reviews. The speciality of this album is that every song's first word is repeated twice at the beginning.

References

External links 
 

2010 films
2010s Tamil-language films
Indian action comedy films
2010 masala films
2010 action comedy films
Super Good Films films